Universitet-Tekhnolog or University of Technology was a  Russian women's volleyball club based in Belgorod. The club played in the Super League, the top Russian league until 2009–10.

Previous names
 Teacher (Pedagogue) (1984–1992)
 White Star (1992–1997)
 University (1997–2006)
 University Belgorod (2006–2009)
 University of Technology (2009–2010)

History
It played in the lower divisions of the Soviet Championship (until 1990–91) and Russian Championship (from 1991–92). The club changed its name to  ahead of the 1992–93 season and played in the second division a season later.

Another name change came in the 1996–97 season when the club became  before its debut at the Super League in the 1997–98 season. The club's results improved year by year and the club recorded strong finishes in the Super League such as second in 2000–01, third in 2001–02, second in 2002–03 and fourth in 2003–04. These results allowed the club to take part in European competitions such as the Top Teams Cup (in 2001–02 and 2003–04) and the CEV Cup (in 2002–03 and 2004–05). From 2004 the results started to decline and the club was relegated at the end of the 2005–06 season.

Ahead of the 2006–07 season, the club moved under Lokomotiv Belgorod structure and was renamed . Results started to improve again, promotion back to the Super league was achieved during that same season. In the following season (2007–08), the club finished sixth place in the Super League. Despite the seventh place finish at the 2008–09 Super League, the club won the 2008 Russian Cup and qualified for the CEV Champions League.

It finish eleventh at the 2009–10 Super League and reached the play-off stages of the 2009–10 CEV Women's Champions League after beating eventual champions Volley Bergamo at the group stage. The club was dissolved at the end of that season.

Honours

National competitions
  Russian Cup: 1
2008

Team squad
This was the club's last squad, from season 2009–2010

References

External links
 VC Universitet-Tekhnolog Belgorod official website 
 Club profile  at ВФВ (Volleyball Federation of Russia)
 Club profile at CEV

Russian volleyball clubs
Volleyball clubs established in 1984
1984 establishments in Russia
Sport in Belgorod
Defunct sports teams in Russia